Leon Alphonsus Martell (June 29, 1883 – October 11, 1947) was a catcher and first baseman in Major League Baseball. Nicknamed "Marty", he played for the Philadelphia Phillies and Boston Doves.

References

External links

 Arlington National Cemetery

1883 births
1947 deaths
Major League Baseball catchers
Philadelphia Phillies players
Boston Doves players
Rochester Bronchos players
Baseball players from Boston
DuBois Miners players